Leah Johnson is an American writer. Her debut novel You Should See Me In A Crown (2020) received critical acclaim, including a Stonewall Book Honor. Her second book Rise to the Sun was released in 2021.

Early life and education 
Johnson was raised on the west side of Indianapolis, Indiana. She was an avid reader from childhood. Johnson went on to be the editor-in-chief of her high school's newspaper as well as a tennis player and a member of the show and concert choirs. While in college at Indiana University Bloomington, she interned at the Wall Street Journal, WFIU, and WPLN. Johnson received her MFA in fiction writing from Sarah Lawrence College.

Career 
Johnson began the manuscript for her debut novel You Should See Me In A Crown in 2018 as a graduate student at Sarah Lawrence College. After publishing an Electric Literature essay about the dearth of diverse YA literature, editor Sarah Landis reached out to help her craft a book proposal. You Should See Me In A Crown centers a Black queer teenager who runs for Prom Queen to win a college scholarship. Johnson described the book as "very much an homage to the work that I love the most...John Hughes movies of the eighties, the teen romantic comedies of the late '90s, early aughts... I love those stories so much and wanted to see someone like me reflected in them as more than a sidekick."

Published in 2020 by Scholastic, the book received critical acclaim. It received a Stonewall Book honor and was selected as Reese Witherspoon's first YA book of the month, among other accolades.

Her second novel Rise to the Sun was released on July 6, 2021. The book is about "two girls named Toni and Olivia who both go to a music festival and search for two very different things."

Personal life 
Johnson resides in Brooklyn. She identifies as queer, and came to accept her sexuality while writing her debut novel You Should See Me In A Crown.

References

External links 
 Official website

1993 births
Living people
African-American women writers
American LGBT novelists
Writers from Indianapolis
Queer writers
Indiana University Bloomington alumni
Sarah Lawrence College alumni
LGBT African Americans
Queer women
21st-century African-American people
21st-century African-American women